Agneta Berliner, born in 1958, is a Swedish politician of the Liberal People's Party. She has been a member of the Riksdag since 2006.

External links 
Agneta Berliner at the Riksdag website

Members of the Riksdag from the Liberals (Sweden)
Living people
1958 births
Women members of the Riksdag
21st-century Swedish women politicians